Patrick Donovan is an Irish professional boxer. As an amateur, Donovan competed at the 2016 World Youth Championships.

Professional career

Early career
On 20 June 2019, it was announced that Donovan had signed a contract to fight professionally with Top Rank where he would be promoted by Bob Arum. Donovan made his professional debut on 11 October 2019 against Arturo Lopez. In the opening round, Donovan landed a clean left hand which put his opponent on the canvas. Donovan was declared the winner by knockout after Lopez failed to beat the count.

Donovan fought Danny Mendoza on 16 November 2019. In the opening moments of the second round, Donovan connected with a sharp left hand which resulted in his opponent receiving a standing count. Donovan continued to control the remainder of the bout and sealed the win after winning every round on the referees scored card. On 20 December 2019, Donovan faced Oscar Amador. Donovan dominated the opening two rounds, consistently landing to both the head and body. In the third round, Donovan connected with a powerful left hand which knocked his opponent down. Donovan secured the win after Amador was unable to recover from the knockdown.

On 15 August 2020, Donovan fought against Des Newton. Donovan dropped his opponent with a left hook in the opening moments of the first round. Newton recovered from the knockdown, however, Donovan proceeded to land a powerful right uppercut to the body which knocked his opponent down for a second time. Following the second knockdown, the referee called an end to the bout. On 11 November 2020, Donovan faced Jumaane Camero. Donovan won via points decision after outboxing his opponent throughout the duration of the bout.

Donovan fought Siar Ozgul on 19 February 2021. In the opening rounds, Donovan succeeded in landing a number of uppercuts against his shorter opponent. In the fourth round, Donovan appeared to hurt Ozgul after connecting with a powerful left hook. At the end of the fourth round, Ozgul's corner opted to retire their fighter after he sustained large amounts of damage. On 6 August 2021, Donovan fought Jose Luis Castillo. In the first round, Donovan knocked his opponent down after landing a heavy left hook to the body of Castillo. The referee called an end to the bout after Castillo was unable to beat the count.

On 26 February 2022, Donovan fought on the undercard of Josh Taylor vs Jack Catterall, in a bout against Miroslav Serban. Donovan won via technical knockout in the sixth round after the referee called an end to the bout following an injury to Serban's left ear. Donovan faced Tom Hill on 6 August 2022. Donovan controlled the bout from the outset and was declared the winner via wide points decision after winning every round of the bout on the referees scorecard.

Professional boxing record

References

External links

Year of birth missing (living people)
Living people
Welterweight boxers
Irish male boxers
People from Ennis
People from County Clare
Sportspeople from County Clare